Bring It On: In It to Win It is a 2007 American cheerleading teen comedy film directed by Steve Rash and starring Ashley Benson, Cassandra Scerbo and Michael Copon.

It is the fourth installment in the Bring It On film series, which focuses on competitive cheerleading. It was shot at Universal Orlando Resort in Orlando, United States. It was released direct-to-video on December 18, 2007.

There are no recurring cast members or canonical references to its predecessors. Only Steve Rash, who also directed the previous film, Bring It On: All or Nothing, returned to direct this film. The film stylistically refers to its predecessors in that it opens with a choreographed routine that turns out to be a dream sequence of the protagonist and the end credits feature outtakes and clips of the cast having fun dancing.

Plot
The West Coast Sharks Cheerleading Squad, led by Carson, are attending Camp Spirit-Thunder where they're confronted by their arch-rivals, the East Coast Jets Cheerleading Squad, led by Brooke. (The squads' names are an inside reference to West Side Story.) Both are fierce rivals because each is the best on its respective coast; however, the Jets have beaten the Sharks at the annual Cheer Camp Championships for the previous three years in a row.

On her first day at camp, Carson meets and hits it off with Penn. They trade phone numbers, neither knowing the other is a member of their arch-rival squad. When Carson eventually does find out that Penn is a Jet, she gives him up although she really likes him. Penn really likes her too, but is just playing it cool around his squad.

As part of the Camp Spirit-Thunder ritual, the West Coast Sharks are given the Spirit Stick, a "special" cheerleading item that they have to guard fiercely. Carson agrees to watch the Spirit Stick when her friends leave for a poker game, but she forgets about it when Penn arrives to ask her out. They go to a nearby amusement park and spend time together, notably dancing in front of the Universal Studios sign and Hard Rock Cafe. At this time, Penn confesses his darkest secret to Carson, while sitting near the Jaws Ride: he forced his team to raise money for him to go to the camp so that his father wouldn't find out he is a cheerleader.

Carson's friends return to her room, but find both her and the Spirit Stick missing. They search for her, eventually finding her dancing with Penn. At this time Brooke and her friends also see the duo. When the Sharks reveal that the Spirit Stick is gone, Carson accuses the Jets of sending Penn to lure her away, and she angrily announces to all Penn's secret. The Sharks are worried, because losing the Spirit Stick means they are "cursed".

The Sharks decide to hold a ceremony to ask the "Cheer Gods" for forgiveness. They are interrupted when the Jets arrive, and the squads have a "cheer-rumble". (This scene is a homage to the Jets/Sharks face-off in West Side Story.) The authorities arrive, and in the ensuing melee, a number of members from both teams become injured. Both squads are forced to leave the camp as neither one has enough members to compete. But before they can board their respective buses, Carson suggests to Brooke that they combine into a single squad to compete at the Cheer Camp Championship. Though reluctant at first, the squads come together as the "East-West Coast Shets complete with new uniforms made through patching their old uniforms together. The two teams slowly bond, while Carson works on repairing her relationship with Penn.

The Shets sneak into Camp Victory, the rival of Camp Spirit-Thunder, to scope Camp Victory's star team, the Flamingos. After seeing their impressive performance, Carson devises a new routine, inspired by the Double Dragon ride at the amusement park. On the day of the competition, the Shets perform their routine perfectly, winning the competition outright. Carson and Penn kiss on the mat in the middle of the celebrations, and it is revealed that Camp Victory are the ones responsible for stealing the Spirit Stick.

The end credits feature clips of the cast dancing "all over the world", while the singer Ashley Tisdale, Disney Channel and High School Musical Star, (who is the sister of Jennifer Tisdale) performs her single "He Said She Said".

Cast

Ashley Benson as Carson, the leader of the West Coast Sharks Cheerleading Squad
Cassie Scerbo as Brooke, the leader of the East Coast Jets Cheerleading Squad
Michael Copon as Penn, Carson's love interest, a member of the Jets Cheerleading Squad
Jennifer Tisdale as Chelsea, a member of the Jets Cheerleading squad
Anniese Taylor Dendy as Aeysha, a member of Sharks Cheerleading Squad
Noel Areizaga as Ruben, a member of the Sharks Cheerleading Squad
Kierstin Koppel as Sarah, a goth who is a member of the Sharks Cheerleading Squad
Adam Vernier as Vance 
Tanisha Harris as Chicago
Jobeth Locklear as Shelby
Lisa Glaze as Pepper
Ashley Tisdale as herself
Kimberly Newbern as Shets Dancer
Katrina Norman as Shets Dancer
Chris Moss as Shets Dancer
Brian White as Shets Dancer
Mike Burns as Shets Dancer

Music

Reception
On Rotten Tomatoes the film has 3 reviews, all of them negative.
On Vudu Movies the film is provided with parental guidelines to the movie. The guidelines express that cheerleading has "too many stereotypes", children under 12 years of age should not watch, and there is a moderate amount of sex, violence, language, consumerism, and drugs (alcohol, smoking, etc.).

References

External links
 

2007 films
2000s high school films
2000s sports comedy films
2000s teen comedy films
2007 direct-to-video films
American high school films
American sports comedy films
American teen comedy films
Beacon Pictures films
Bring It On (film series)
Cheerleading films
Direct-to-video comedy films
Direct-to-video sequel films
2000s English-language films
Films directed by Steve Rash
Films shot in Florida
Teen sports films
Universal Pictures direct-to-video films
2007 comedy films
American direct-to-video films
2000s American films